Puthariyankam is a 1978 Indian Malayalam film, directed by P. G. Vishwambharan. The film stars Vincent, Sudheer, Roja Ramani, Unnimary, Poojappura Ravi and Seema in the lead roles. The film has musical score by A. T. Ummer. Its last three reels were shot in Eastman colour.

Cast
Sudheer  
Vincent
Unnimary 
Seema 
Shobhana 
Vijayalalitha
Sreelatha Namboothiri 
Poojappura Ravi

Soundtrack
The music was composed by A. T. Ummer and the lyrics were written by Yusufali Kechery.

References

1978 films
1970s Malayalam-language films
Films directed by P. G. Viswambharan